WKRV 107.1 FM is a radio station broadcasting a classic hits format. Licensed to Vandalia, Illinois, the station serves the Vandalia and Effingham areas.

References

External links
WKRV's website

KRV